Marija Dostanić (born 29 July 1999) is a Serbian sprint canoer.
Her last victories are the women's k-2 500m with Biljana Relić in the European Sprint Championships U-23 2019 and the women's k-1 500m kayak single in the European Junior Sprint Championships 2017.

She finished 15th in the K-1 1000 metres event at the 2018 Canoe Sprint World Championships, and also competed in the K-4 500 metres event at the 2019 Canoe Sprint World Championships and the K-2 500 metres event at the 2019 European Games.

References

1999 births
Living people
Sportspeople from Sremska Mitrovica
Serbian female canoeists
Canoeists at the 2019 European Games
European Games competitors for Serbia